1100 was a year.

1100 may also refer to:
Bréguet 1100, an aircraft
Fiat 1100, an automobile
Goliath 1100, an automobile
Simca 1100, an automobile
1100 aluminium alloy, a metal alloy
Nokia 1100, a mobile phone
Remington 1100, a shotgun
1100 AM, radio stations with this frequency